Old Harbour House is a building in the center of Fort Kochi, part of the city of Kochi (formerly known as Cochin) in the district of Ernakulam in the state of Kerala (India). It was built during the Portuguese colonial period, almost completely rebuilt by the Dutch in the 17th century, and later modified by the British. In 2006, it was carefully restored by German architect Karl Damschen with many references to its colonial origins. Today the building contains the boutique hotel Old Harbour Hotel.

References

External links 
 Old Harbour Hotel

Buildings and structures in Kochi